Bickenhill is a small village in the civil parish of Bickenhill and Marston Green, in the Solihull district, in the county of the West Midlands, England, on the eastern fringe of the West Midlands conurbation. Bickenhill is home to Birmingham Airport. Bickenhill is also a ward. It is in the historic county of Warwickshire.

History
The manor of Bickenhill was held by Edward the Confessor, by Alward, and then by Turchil. It is recorded in the Domesday Book of 1086. The descendants of Turchil, the Arden family, settled in the area and adopted the surname 'de Bickenhill,' though spelt differently. The name developed into de Bickenhill in the 13th century. In 1295, Alice de Langley gave herself the title Lady of Bickenhill. A manor then developed in Bickenhill and by the 15th century, there were two manors. It is believed that both manors shared rights by the end of the century. The manors were no longer existing by the end of the 16th century.

The parish was rural in the 19th century but began to develop in the early 20th century into a populous area.

Many changes to the area were made during the nineteenth century. Solihull parish received a detached part of Bickenhill parish, known as Lyndon Quarter, in 1874. The area had been known as Lyndon or Ulverley, after the Ulverlie family who were the original land-owners in the area. When they constructed a new town at a nearby crossroads, which was to become Solihull, old Ulverley became the Old Town, later corrupted to Olton. Though Elmdon parish lay between Olton and Bickenhill proper, the area was administratively Bickenhill until transfer to Solihull, and finally independent with the building of St. Margaret's parish church. The area had been rapidly suburbanising because of the opening of a railway station at Olton, which allowed those who worked in Birmingham to live there and commute. It soon became a suburb of Birmingham. Marston Green, in the north of the parish proper and now the other side of the airport, suburbanised similarly due to having its own station.

Bickenhill proper, however, was not to benefit from the railway boom, despite having what is now the West Coast Main Line running very nearby. No station was opened near the village until Birmingham International at Birmingham Airport in the 1970s. 
The M42 motorway and the busy A45 road run close by to the East and North of the village respectively.

Before the decision was taken to rebuild Wembley Stadium in north London, Bickenhill was a contender to be the site of the new national stadium, indeed the supposed forerunner. National posters on behalf of the Wembley bid proclaimed, 'One day I'll play at Bickenhill...', in a tongue-in-cheek offensive against the proposal.

Solihull's landfill site is located in Bickenhill, and that of North Warwickshire in Little Packington, visible from the village.

Parish
The parish of Bickenhill and Marston Green covers the village of Bickenhill itself and the town of Marston Green. Also in the parish are Birmingham Airport, the National Exhibition Centre, and the National Motorcycle Museum. In the 2011 census the parish population was 7,153, an increase from the 2001 Census figure of 6,583. Solihull Metropolitan Borough Council maintain a waste recycling centre in the parish. The civil parish was renamed from Bickenhill to Bickenhill and Marston Green in 2014.

The parish is crossed by two major roads: the M42 and the A45. The A45 is referred to locally as the Coventry Road.

Village
The village of Bickenhill is south of the A45 road (whereas the rest of the parish is north of the A45). The Church of England parish church of Saint Peter is Norman and as built in 1140. The toponym 'Bickenhill' is derived from the Old English for 'projecting hill'. The majority of the older houses in Bickenhill village are Georgian or Victorian.

The village boasts Páirc na hÉireann, the primary venue for Gaelic games in the West Midlands. It boasts three full-size Gaelic Athletic Association pitches with eight changing rooms, bar area and car-parking.

Local villages include Catherine-de-Barnes, Hampton-in-Arden and Meriden.

Governance
The two main local authorities responsible for the parish are Solihull Metropolitan Borough Council and Bickenhill Parish Council. The Parish Council is responsible for maintaining facilities such as churchyards, cemeteries and parks in the parish and its offices are located at a park near Marston Green.

Bickenhill ward elects three councillors to the metropolitan borough council.

Further reading

References

Villages in the West Midlands (county)
Solihull
Conservation areas in England